Targeted projection pursuit is a type of statistical technique used for exploratory data analysis, information visualization, and feature selection. It allows the user to interactively explore very complex data (typically having tens to hundreds of attributes) to find features or patterns of potential interest.

Conventional, or 'blind', projection pursuit, finds the most "interesting" possible projections in multidimensional data, using a search algorithm that optimizes some fixed criterion of "interestingness" – such as deviation from a normal distribution. In contrast, targeted projection pursuit allows the user to explore the space of projections by manipulating data points directly in an interactive scatter plot.

Targeted projection pursuit has found applications in DNA microarray data analysis, protein sequence analysis, graph layout and digital signal processing. It is available as a package for the WEKA machine learning toolkit.

References

Further reading 
 Joe Faith (2007) "Targeted Projection Pursuit for Interactive Exploration of High-Dimensional Data Sets", Proceedings of 11th International Conference on Information Visualisation

External links 
 imDEV free Excel add-in for targeted projection pursuits using feature selection coupled with PLS and PLS-DA
 Targeted Projection Pursuit project page

Statistical charts and diagrams